Peter Sirmon (born February 18, 1977) is a former American football linebacker in the National Football League.  He was drafted in the 2000 NFL Draft by the Tennessee Titans and played for them for his entire career from 2000 to 2006. Sirmon played college football at the University of Oregon, and high school football at Walla Walla High School, where he played quarterback and safety.

In 2008, Sirmon became the linebackers coach at Central Washington. 

He was the linebackers coach at the University of Tennessee under head coach Derek Dooley in 2010 and 2011. Sirmon worked under his Oregon defensive teammate Justin Wilcox, who had become defensive coordinator at Tennessee. He also followed Wilcox in 2012 and was named the linebackers coach at University of Washington. He was brought in by Steve Sarkisian as his linebackers coach when Wilcox was hired by the University of Southern 
California as defensive coordinator.

On January 12, 2016, Peter Sirmon became the new defensive coordinator at Mississippi State. 

In January 2017, Mississippi State replaced Sirmon and hired Todd Grantham as defensive coordinator from Louisville. Sirmon was then named the new defensive coordinator at the Louisville in a rare swap of coaching.

Sirmon left Louisville and moved to the University of California, Berkeley in 2018, where he is the Bears' inside linebackers coach and defensive coordinator.  

Prior to the 2019 season, Sirmon was named co-defensive coordinator at Cal.

Alongside fellow staff member Tim DeRuyter, Sirmon was named FootballScoop's Linebacker Coach of the Year in 2019.

References

External links
 Career statistics and player information from Pro Football Reference
California bio
Mississippi state bio

1977 births
Living people
American football middle linebackers
Oregon Ducks football players
Tennessee Titans players
Central Washington Wildcats football coaches
Oregon Ducks football coaches
Tennessee Volunteers football coaches
Washington Huskies football coaches
USC Trojans football coaches
Sportspeople from Walla Walla, Washington